Serkan Bayram (born 1 April 1974) is a Turkish politician and lawyer. He is currently serving as an MP in the Turkish Grand Assembly (Turkish: Türkiye Büyük Millet Meclisi, abbreviated as TBMM) with the Justice and Development Party (AK Party).

Early life and career 
Serkan Bayram was born on 1 April 1974 in the village of Üçören in the province of Erzincan to Mustafa Bayram and his wife Emine. After graduating from the Law Faculty of Istanbul University in 1996, Bayram worked as a lawyer. In 2000, he received a master's degree from the Marmara University. He worked as a columnist in several newspapers. He has two children and he can speak French.

Member of parliament 
Bayram joined the Justice and Development Party (AK Party), and entered the Turkish Grand National Assembly (TBMM) as a deputy from Erzincan after the General elections on June 7, 2015. He was re-elected in November 2015. As a member of parliament, Bayram is a member of the parliamentary Security and intelligence Commission. Now, he works as Binali Yıldırım's lawyer.

References 

1974 births
Living people
People from Refahiye
Justice and Development Party (Turkey) politicians
21st-century Turkish politicians
20th-century Turkish lawyers
Istanbul University Faculty of Law alumni